The Embassy of the Central African Republic in Washington, D.C. is the diplomatic mission of the Central African Republic (CAR) to the United States. It located in the Adams Morgan neighborhood in Northwest Washington D.C.

The position of ambassador has been vacant since 29 July 2016. The current chargé d'affaires is Lydie Flore Magba.

List of ambassadors

 Michel Gallin-Douathe (1960–1962)
 Jean-Pierre Kombet (1962–1965)
 Michel Gallin-Douathe (1965–1970)
 Roger Guérillot (1970–1971)
 Christophe Maïdou (1971–1973)
 Gaston Banda-Bafiot (1973–1975)
 David Nguindo (1975–1976)
 Christophe Maïdou (1976–1980)
 Jacques Topande-Makombo (1980–1982)
 Christian Lingama-Toleque (1982–1989)
 Jean-Pierre Sohahong-Kombet (1989–1994)
 Henry Koba (1994–2001)
 Emmanuel Touaboy (2001–2009)
 Stanislas Moussa-Kembe (2009–2016)
 Lydie Flore Magba (2016–present)

See also
 Central African Republic – United States relations

Notes

References

External links
 Official website
 Embassy of the Central African Republic in Washington, D.C. at EmbassyPages.com

Central African Republic
Washington, D.C.
Central African Republic–United States relations